Reductoderces fuscoflava is a moth of the Psychidae family. It was described by Salmon and Bradley in 1956. It is found on Campbell Island.

References

 Reductoderces fuscoflava in species id

Moths described in 1956
Moths of New Zealand
Psychidae